Castroville is a city in Medina County, Texas, United States. Its population was 2,680 at the 2010 census. Prior to 1893, Castroville was the first county seat of Medina County. Castroville was founded by Alsatian-Texans, who were mostly Germanic-speaking people who came to Texas during the German emigration period of the mid-1800s. Most Alsatians who came to Castroville spoke Alsatian (a dialect of German origin integrating Celtic, Yiddish, and French words). The Alsatian culture and language are still kept alive by the residents of Castroville.

History

The first colonists disembarked at Galveston on January 9, 1843. They were taken by ship to Lavaca Bay and traveled overland to San Antonio, where they took shelter in abandoned buildings until the Texas Rangers were prepared to escort them to their land and protect them from hostile Indians. On September 2, 1844, the first colonists arrived at Castro's land grant on the Medina River.

From 1849, Castroville, on the Medina River, was a water stop on the San Antonio-El Paso Road and a stagecoach station on the San Antonio-El Paso Mail Line and San Antonio-San Diego Mail Line.

After a few hard years, the town and surrounding farms flourished, but for generations, the residents remained insular. In Castroville's first century, a visitor would be more likely to hear Alsatian—a dialect spoken in Europe before Standard German was prevalent—than English spoken in the town's homes, stores, and taverns. Modern Alsatian travelers noted that the dialect spoken in Castroville was more like that which was spoken in the 1840s. The descendants of the original settlers worked diligently to preserve their language, whose usage in Europe has been diminished by the political actions of France and Germany, especially since World War II.

The Steinbach Haus (originally built between 1618 and 1648 in Wahlbach, Alsace) was dismantled and reconstructed in Castroville in 1998. It was opened to the public in 2002.

Castroville is a sister city of Ensisheim (Alsace) in France.

Geography

Castroville is located at  (29.3550, −98.8807). This is 20 miles west of downtown San Antonio.

Demographics

2020 census

As of the 2020 United States census, there were 2,954 people, 1,113 households, and 860 families residing in the city.

2010 census
As of the census of 2010, 3,053 people resided in the city.

Of the 941 households, 37.4% had children under 18 living with them, 61.5% were married couples living together, 10.4% had a female householder with no husband present, and 23.5% were not families. About 20.5% of all households were made up of individuals, and 8.7% had someone living alone who was 65 or older. The average household size was 2.74, and the average family size was 3.17.

In the city, the population was distributed as 28.0% under 18, 6.9% from 18 to 24, 27.7% from 25 to 44, 21.7% from 45 to 64, and 15.6% who were 65 or older. The median age was 37 years. For every 100 females, there were 97.2 males. For every 100 females age 18 and over, there were 88.3 males.

The median income for a household in the city was $42,308, and for a family was $51,007. Males had a median income of $35,625 versus $27,228 for females. The per capita income for the city was $20,615. About 5.4% of families and 9.1% of the population were below the poverty line, including 11.9% of those under age 18 and 5.9% of those age 65 or over.

Education

The City of Castroville is served by the Medina Valley Independent School District and Saint Louis Catholic School (prekindergarten–5th grade).

Gallery

References

External links

Castroville, Texas official Page
Castroville Chamber of Commerce
https://web.archive.org/web/20110128123337/http://preservecastroville.com/
https://web.archive.org/web/20090902091004/http://www.castrovilletx.com/castroville-texas-history.htm Castroville Texas City History
Handbook of Texas Online: Castroville, Texas

Cities in Texas
Cities in Medina County, Texas
Populated places established in 1844
1844 establishments in the Republic of Texas
San Antonio–El Paso Road
San Antonio–San Diego Mail Line
Stagecoach stops in the United States